Boris Tokarev (May 16, 1927 – December 17, 2002) was a Soviet athlete who competed mainly in the 100 and 200 metres. He trained in Leningrad and later in Moscow at the Armed Forces sports society.

Biography
He competed for the USSR in the 1952 Summer Olympics held in Helsinki, Finland in the 4 x 100 metre relay where he won the silver medal with his team mates Levan Kalyayev, Levan Sanadze and Vladimir Sukharev.

At the 1956 Summer Olympics held in Melbourne, Australia Boris teamed up with Vladimir Sukharyev again ran in the 4 x 100 metres relay with a new team of Leonid Bartenev and Yuriy Konovalov who again managed to finish second. He also managed a fifth place over 200 metres in Melbourne.

External links
 

1927 births
2002 deaths
Russian male sprinters
Soviet male sprinters
Olympic silver medalists for the Soviet Union
Athletes (track and field) at the 1952 Summer Olympics
Athletes (track and field) at the 1956 Summer Olympics
Olympic athletes of the Soviet Union
Armed Forces sports society athletes
European Athletics Championships medalists
Medalists at the 1956 Summer Olympics
Medalists at the 1952 Summer Olympics
Olympic silver medalists in athletics (track and field)